Jonathan Cohen is a French actor. He is known for co-starring in the Netflix prequel film to Army of the Dead, Army of Thieves (2021).

Early life
Cohen was born in Paris, France. He is the only child to parents who divorced when he was five. His grandfather is a rabbi.

Filmography

Films
 2009 : Partir  : le banquier
 2010 : Je l'aimais : le serveur
 2010 : Le Village des ombres : Mathias
 2010 : L'amour c'est mieux à deux : Le serveur lors de l'anniversaire de mariage
 2012 : Il était une fois, une fois : le directeur des ressources humaines
 2012 : Dépression et des potes : le professeur de yoga
 2012 : Mains armées : Philippe
 2012 : Un plan parfait : Patrick
 2013 : Amour et turbulences
 2013 : Pop Redemption
 2013 : 16 ans... ou presque'
 2014 : Supercondriaque 2014 : La Crème de la crème 2014 : Quantum Love 2014 : Almost Friends 2015 : All Three of Us 2016 : La folle histoire de Max et Léon 2017 : Coexister 2018 : Amanda 2018 : Budapest 2018 : Ami-ami (film) de Victor Saint Macary : Frédéric 2019 : Terrible jungles 2020 : Tout simplement noir 2021 : Army of ThievesTV series
 2010 : Fracture : David Haddad
 2011 : Nerdz : Vendeur de Jeux vidéo
 2011 : La Chanson du dimanche : Shouhil – Cyril
 2011 : Les Invincibles : Hassan
 2011 : Les 2 mecs qui bossent à Canal 2011 : Bref 2012 : Les Pieds dans le plat : Samuel Benhaim
 2013 : Hero Corp : Julien
 2016 : Serge le Mytho : Serge le Mytho
 2019-2021 :  Family Business : Joseph Hazan
 2020 : La Flamme : Marc (also co-creator)
 2022 : Le Flambeau : Les aventuriers de Chupacabra'' : Marc (also co-creator)

References

External links

 

Living people
21st-century French Jews
French male film actors
French male television actors
French male voice actors
21st-century French male actors
Year of birth missing (living people)